Mejía is a Spanish surname dating back to the early 1500s. Its exact origins are disputed, especially whether the name is related to Sephardic Jews. In Spain, the surname is predominantly found in Galicia and Toledo. It is also common in several Latin American countries, particularly Mexico, Honduras, and Colombia.

Etymology
The first written record of the surname being used is in the marriage of a Galician man named García Sánchez de Mejías to the daughter of Juan Sánchez de Mendoza, brother of Don Lope de Mendoza, Archbishop of Compostela.

The surname may have originated as a toponym for the towns of either Mesía or Muxía in Galicia.

According to "El Blasonario de la Consanguinidad Ibérica" (The Armorial of the Iberian Consanguinity) by genealogists Ampelio Alonso de Cadenas and Don Vicente de Cadenas y Vicent, Mejia is described as having been brought to Galicia and León by Sevillians who escaped to the mountainous northern provinces amidst the Moorish invasions of southern Spain, Prior to this, the bearers of the name had lived in Seville since Visigoth and Roman times. After the Reconquista, some returned to Seville.

Another common theory is that the name may have Sephardic origins, from when the Spanish Kingdom forced Jewish settlers to change their surname to Castillian. The basis for this theory is that the literal translation of the word for "Messiah" is "Mesía". However, others have argued that the name could have simply been assigned at baptism by a priest who chose to use a biblical word, rather than as a result of translation. In addition, Spaniards with any Jewish or Muslim ancestry were not allowed to emigrate to the New World colonies, and so this theory might not account for the extensive popularity of the surname in Latin America today.

Finally, it is theorized that the word "Mexia" used to mean "medicine" in an old variant of Spanish.

Note that Mexía is the older Spanish spelling of the name. In the modern orthography of Spain, the spelling is Mejía, though in Mexico the older orthography is still considered correct. Similarly, until recently Spaniards rendered the country name Méjico rather than México, though this has reversed in recent decades out of deference to Mexico.

Geographical distribution
As of 2014, 23.7% of all known bearers of the surname Mejía were residents of Mexico (frequency 1:450), 16.2% of Colombia (1:253), 14.4% of Honduras (1:53), 8.0% of Guatemala (1:172), 6.5% of the Dominican Republic (1:138), 6.3% of the United States (1:4,915), 6.3% of El Salvador (1:86), 4.7% of Peru (1:583), 2.9% of Ecuador (1:475), 2.8% of Nicaragua (1:185), 2.5% of the Philippines (1:3,461), 2.0% of Venezuela (1:1,266) and 1.8% of Bolivia (1:510).

In Spain, the frequency of the surname was higher than national average (1:5,678) in the following autonomous communities:
 1. Community of Madrid (1:2,644)
 2. Castilla–La Mancha (1:3,787)
 3. Catalonia (1:4,083)
 4. Navarre (1:5,176)
 5. Balearic Islands (1:5,189)
 6. La Rioja (1:5,296)

In Honduras, the frequency of the surname was higher than national average (1:53) in the following departments:
 1. Ocotepeque Department (1:19)
 2. Copán Department (1:31)
 3. La Paz Department (1:32)
 4. Santa Bárbara Department (1:40)
 5. Comayagua Department (1:40)
 6. Cortés Department (1:43)
 7. Lempira Department (1:44)
 8. Colón Department (1:49)
 9. Atlántida Department (1:50)
 10. Yoro Department (1:52)

Popularity in Colombia
The surname is a popular last name in Colombia, especially its Paisa region. According to the book "Genealogies of Antioquia and Caldas" by Gabriel Arango Mejía, the first Spaniard to bring the name to Colombia was a man named Don Juan Mejía de Tobar Montoya.

People

Mejía, Mejia

Mejías, Mejias
 Javier Mejías (born 1983), Spanish bicycle racer
 Octavio Mejías (born 1982), Venezuelan weightlifter
 Román Mejías (born 1930), Dominican American baseball player, outfielder
 Sam Mejías (born 1952), Dominican American baseball player, outfielder
 Tomás Mejías (born 1989), Spanish football player
 Wolfgang Mejías (born 1983), Venezuelan olympic épée fencer
 Yasmín Mejías, a Puerto Rican actress, comedian, singer, and politician

Mexía, Mexia
 Alvaro Mexia, a 17th-century Spanish explorer and cartographer of the east coast of Florida
 José Antonio Mexía (1800–1839), Mexican politician
 Pedro Mexía, a 16th-century Spanish Renaissance writer, humanist and historian
 Ynés Mexía (1870-1938), Mexican American botanist and explorer

References

Spanish-language surnames